The Art Directors Guild Award for Excellence in Production Design for a Period Film is one of the annual awards given by the Art Directors Guild starting from 2000.

This award was combined with Excellence in Production Design for a Fantasy Film from 2000 to 2005, and is now in its own category from 2006.

Winners and nominees

2000–2005 (Fantasy or Period)

2006–2009 (Period)

2010s

2020s

References

Art Directors Guild Awards
2000s in American cinema
2010s in American cinema